Steneromene nymphocharis is a moth in the family Crambidae. It was described by Edward Meyrick in 1932, and is found in Argentina.

References

Diptychophorini
Moths described in 1932